Phoenix Industries, Inc. was an American aircraft manufacturer based in Southampton, New Jersey. The company specialized in the design and manufacture of powered parachutes and paramotors in the form of ready-to-fly aircraft in the US FAR 103 Ultralight Vehicles category.

The company produced a powered paraglider, the Phoenix Industries B1Z ParaFlyer of which ten had been sold by 2000, and three powered parachute designs, the Phoenix Industries CV1 ParaFlyer, Phoenix Industries TZ-1 ParaFlyer and the Phoenix Industries Sport. A total of 15 CV1 ParaFlyers and 16 Sports had been sold by 2005. All designs were single-seaters.

The company seems to have been established c. 1997 and gone out of business about 2005.

Aircraft

References

External links

Former location of company website
Company website archives on Archive.org

Defunct aircraft manufacturers of the United States
Ultralight aircraft
Powered parachutes
Paramotors